Abdelmeguid Sabata (also known as Abdelmajid Sebbata; Arabic: عبد المجيد سباطة) (born 1989) is a Moroccan writer and translator.

Life 
He was born in Rabat and studied engineering at Abdelmalek Essaadi University in Tangiers. He has also studied at the King Fahd School of Translation in Tangiers.

In addition to being an award-winning author, Sabata is also a translator. He has translated two novels by the French writer Michel Bussi.

Sabata's 2020 novel File 42 was shortlisted for the International Prize for Arabic Fiction in 2021 (also called the "Arabic Booker Prize"). He was among the youngest writers on that year's list, at the time 32 years of age.

Works 
He has written three novels: 
 Behind the Wall of Passion (2015), 
 The Zero Hour 00:00 (2017) (winner of the Moroccan Book Award)
 File 42 (2020) (nominated for the Arabic Booker Prize)

References

21st-century Moroccan writers
1989 births
Living people
People from Rabat